Robert Clark (born 27 December 1939) is an Australian wrestler. He competed in two events at the 1960 Summer Olympics.

References

External links
 

1939 births
Living people
Australian male sport wrestlers
Olympic wrestlers of Australia
Wrestlers at the 1960 Summer Olympics
Sportspeople from Melbourne
Sportsmen from Victoria (Australia)